Vasodilator-stimulated phosphoprotein is a protein that in humans is encoded by the VASP gene.

Function 

Vasodilator-stimulated phosphoprotein (VASP) is a member of the Ena-VASP protein family. Ena-VASP family members contain an N-terminal EVH1 domain that binds proteins containing E/DFPPPPXD/E motifs and targets Ena-VASP proteins to focal adhesions cell membranes. In the mid-region of the protein, family members have a proline-rich region that binds SH3 and WW domain-containing proteins. Their C-terminal EVH2 domain mediates tetramerization and binds both G and F actin. VASP is associated with filamentous actin formation and likely plays a widespread role in cell adhesion and motility. VASP may also be involved in the intracellular signaling pathways that regulate integrin-extracellular matrix interactions. VASP is regulated by the cyclic nucleotide-dependent kinases PKA and PKG.

Interactions
Vasodilator-stimulated phosphoprotein has been shown to interact with Zyxin, Profilin 1, and PFN2.

References

Further reading

EVH1 domain